Ayapa Zoque (Ayapaneco), or Tabasco Zoque, is a critically endangered  Zoquean language of Ayapa, a village 10 km southeast of Comalcalco, in Tabasco, Mexico. The native name is Nuumte Oote "True Voice". A vibrant, albeit minority, language until the middle of the 20th century, the language suffered after the introduction of compulsory education in Spanish, urbanisation, and migration of its speakers. Nowadays there are approximately 15 speakers whose ages range from 67 to 90. In 2010 a story started circulating that the last two speakers of the Ayapaneco language were enemies and no longer talked to each other. The story was incorrect, and while it was quickly corrected it came to circulate widely.

Daniel Suslak, an assistant professor of anthropology at Indiana University, is one of the linguists working to prepare the first dictionary of the language. Since 2012, the Instituto Nacional de Lenguas Indígenas (INALI, also known as the National Indigenous Languages Institute) has been supporting the Ayapa community's efforts at revitalising their language. In 2013 Vodafone launched an advertisement campaign in which they claimed to have helped the community revitalize the language, proposing an erroneous story of enmity between Don Manuel and Don Isidro. The commercial appeared on YouTube. According to Suslak and other observers the actual help provided to Ayapan and the Ayapaneco language by Vodafone was extremely limited and did not address the actual necessities of the community. A PhD dissertation on Ayapa Zoque at the Institut national des langues et civilisations orientales (INALCO) appeared in 2019, and an orthography designed to better facilitate the development of pedagogical materials and education of new learners is under development.

See also
 Language death

References

External links
Indiana University Minority Languages & Cultures of Latin America & the Caribbean Program
 National Indigenous Languages Institute 
 Vocabulario de la lengua zoque de Tapijulapa 
 Jhonnatan Rangel, How many speakers of Ayapa Zoque? in Where's the last speaker? (ISSN 2494-2073),19/05/2016, http://wils.hypotheses.org/351
 Ayapaneco language about to disappear because the only two persons who know it do not speak to each other
 Ho, Erica (April 18, 2011). "Last Two Speakers of Dying Language Refuse to Talk to Each Other". Time.
 "Last 2 Speakers Of Dying Language Won’t Speak To Each Other". Huffington Post. (April 14, 2011).
 Anthro Source

Indigenous languages of Mexico
Endangered Mixe–Zoque languages
Mixe–Zoque languages